Davaineidae is the name of a family of tapeworms that includes helminth parasites of vertebrates. Of the 14 genera recorded under this family, Raillietina is the best understood and most extensively studied. Members of the family are characterized by the presence of a crown (rostellum) at the tip of the scolex, and the rostellum is made up of mattock- or hammer-shaped hooks. The rostellum is surrounded by suckers which are armed with spines.  These tapeworms are most commonly found in birds, and in few cases, mammals, which are the definitive hosts. Intermediate hosts are small insects such as ants. Hosts of Davainea proglottina (length 1 – 4 mm), for example, are chickens. Slugs are the intermediate hosts.

Genera 
 Calostaurus Sandars, 1957
 Cotugnia Diamare, 1893
 Davainea Blanchard, 1891
 Fernandezia Lopez-Neyra, 1936
 Fuhrmannetta Stiles & Orleman, 1926
 Houttuynia Fuhrmann, 1920
 Idiogenes Krabbe, 1868
 Ophryocotyle Friis, 1870
 Otiditaenia Beddard, 1912
 Paroniella Fuhrmann, 1920
 Paspalia Spasskaya & Spasskii, 1971
 Pseudidiogenes Movsesyan, 1971
 Raillietina Fuhrmann, 1920
 Skrjabinia Fuhrmann, 1920

References

External links 
 Australian Faunal Diversity
  Vicipaedia
 
 
 Genus Raillietina

Animal parasites of vertebrates
Cestoda
Platyhelminthes families